Cesar Lobi Manzoki (born 12 October 1996) is a Central African professional footballer who plays as striker for Chinese Super League club Dalian Professional. Born in the Democratic Republic of the Congo, he has represented both the Democratic Republic of Congo and the Central African Republic internationally.

Club career
On 28 July 2020, Manzoki joined Vipers SC in the StarTimes Uganda Premier league where he played 46 games and scored 26 goals and provided 13 assists for the club.  In 2020/21 season, he won the stanbic Uganda Cup Golden boot scoring 7 goals and he also won the league Golden boot with 18 goals in the following season. He won the Pilsner player of the month 4 times and was indicated in the uganda premier league team of the season in 2021/22. He won 1 Uganda Cup and 1Uganda Premier league with Vipers SC. 

On 25 August 2022, Manzoki signed for Dalian Pro.

International career
Manzoki represented the DR Congo national team in three matches in 2016. He switched to represent the Central African Republic national team in 2022.

References

1994 births
Living people
People from Ituri Province
Democratic Republic of the Congo people of Central African Republic descent
Citizens of the Central African Republic through descent
Democratic Republic of the Congo footballers
Central African Republic footballers
Association football forwards
Dual internationalists (football)
Democratic Republic of the Congo international footballers
Central African Republic international footballers
Linafoot players
Uganda Premier League players
AS Dauphins Noirs players
AS Maniema Union players
AS Vita Club players
Vipers SC players
Dalian Professional F.C. players
Democratic Republic of the Congo expatriate footballers
Central African Republic expatriate footballers
Democratic Republic of the Congo expatriate sportspeople in Uganda
Central African Republic expatriate sportspeople in Uganda
Expatriate footballers in Uganda
Democratic Republic of the Congo expatriate sportspeople in China
Central African Republic expatriate sportspeople in China
Expatriate footballers in China
21st-century Democratic Republic of the Congo people